Halloway is the first EP by American singer-songwriter Tessa Violet. It was self-released on September 16, 2016, on CD and made available to download digitally. The title of Halloway was inspired by the character Will Halloway from the 1962 novel Something Wicked This Way Comes by Ray Bradbury. Violet listened to audiobook version while on tour after her mom said it was "one of the scariest books she’s read, and one of the most well-written." Violet described the album as "dark pop". The album was produced by frequent Tessa Violet collaborator Seth Earnest.

Production 
During Halloways production, Violet listened to Taylor Swift's 1989, Troye Sivan's Blue Neighbourhood, and Halsey's Badlands; as well as pop playlists on Spotify.

Alternate versions 
Violet released a royalty-free B sides version through her second reward tier of her Patreon.

Track listing

References

External links 

2016 EPs
Tessa Violet EPs
Self-released EPs